Cyril Seely "Sig" Slater (March 24, 1896 – October 26, 1969) was a Canadian ice hockey player who competed in the 1924 Winter Olympics. He was born in Montreal.

Slater was a member of the Toronto Granites team that won a gold medal for Canada in ice hockey at the 1924 Winter Olympics.

References

External links
 
Cyril Slater at DatabaseOlympics.com
Cril Slater's profile at Sports Reference.com

1896 births
1969 deaths
Ice hockey people from Montreal
Ice hockey players at the 1924 Winter Olympics
Medalists at the 1924 Winter Olympics
Olympic gold medalists for Canada
Olympic ice hockey players of Canada
Olympic medalists in ice hockey